Seoul Woori Card WooriWON is a South Korean professional volleyball team founded in 2008. They are based in Seoul and are members of the Korea Volleyball Federation (KOVO). Their home arena is Jangchung Gymnasium.

Honours 
V-League
Runners-up: 2020–21

KOVO Cup
Winners (2): 2015, 2021
Runners-up (4): 2011, 2013, 2014, 2017

Season-by-season records

Players

2022−23 team

References

External links
Official website 

Volleyball clubs established in 2008
2008 establishments in South Korea
Sport in Seoul
South Korean volleyball clubs